Allegra de Laurentiis is a European philosopher, educated at the Universities of Rome, Tübingen and Frankfurt, who has been teaching at American universities since 1987. She is now Professor of Philosophy at the State University of New York at Stony Brook.
She is known for her works on philosophy of Hegel.

Books
 ' Marx’ und Engels’ Rezeption der Hegelschen Kantkritik. Ein Widerspruch im Materialismus. [Marx’ and Engels’ Appropriation of Hegel’s Kant Criticism. A Contradiction in Materialism.] Frankfurt: Peter Lang, Europäische Hochschulschriften, XX/108, 1983.
 Subjects in the Ancient and Modern World. On Hegel’s Theory of Subjectivity. Basingstoke, UK: Palgrave-MacMillan, 2005
 The Bloomsbury Companion to Hegel. Co-edited with Jeffrey Edwards. London/NY: Bloomsbury, 2013 , 2015
 Hegel’s Anthropology. Life, Psyche, and Second Nature. Evanston, IL: Northwestern University Press, 2021
 Hegel and Metaphysics. On Logic and Ontology in the System. Edited with the collaboration of Soren Whited. Hegel Jahrbuch Sonderband 7. Berlin/Boston: De Gruyter, 2016.
 Kleine Schriften III. Arbeiten zu Hegel und verwandten Themen. Vol. 3 of Manfred Baums kleine Schriften. Co-edited with Jeffrey Edwards. Berlin/Boston: DeGruyter, 2020.

References

External links
Allegra de Laurentiis

Living people
21st-century philosophers
Italian philosophers
Italian women philosophers
Hegel scholars
Stony Brook University faculty
Goethe University Frankfurt alumni
University of Tübingen alumni
Sapienza University of Rome alumni
European philosophers
Year of birth missing (living people)